Class E may refer to:

Science and technology
 Class E amplifier, a power amplifier class in electronics
 Class E addresses, in a classful network, a type of Internet Protocol IP address
 Class E, twisted pair structured cabling system in the ISO/IEC 11801 standard

Other uses
 Class E, an airspace class as defined by the ICAO
 Class E, a driver's license
 Class E felony, a category of crime in the US

See also

 E class (disambiguation)
 Class (disambiguation)
 E (disambiguation)
 E-Type (disambiguation)
 Model E (disambiguation)